Marianne Dugal is a Canadian violinist and pianist from Quebec and is a member of the Montreal Symphony Orchestra where she plays under guidance from Charles Dutoit. She have studied at the Harid Conservatory along with Sergiu Schwartz and then von first prize at the National Society of Arts and Letters. She is also a member of I Musici de Montréal Chamber Orchestra with she appeared on both English and French language channels.

References

External links
Marianne Dugal on Montreal Symphony Orchestra

Living people
Musicians from Quebec
Canadian women pianists
Canadian classical violinists
21st-century Canadian pianists
21st-century Canadian women musicians
21st-century Canadian violinists and fiddlers
Year of birth missing (living people)
Canadian women violinists and fiddlers
21st-century women pianists